Dull Care is a 1919 American silent comedy film featuring Oliver Hardy.

Cast
 Larry Semon as Larry, a Detective
 William Hauber as Chief Crook (as Bill Hauber)
 Frank Alexander as Chief of Police
 Lucille Carlisle as Chief of Police's Wife
 Oliver Hardy as A Janitor (as Babe Hardy)
 Al Thompson
 James Donnelly

See also
 List of American films of 1919
 Oliver Hardy filmography

External links

1919 films
American silent short films
American black-and-white films
1919 comedy films
1919 short films
Films directed by Larry Semon
Silent American comedy films
American comedy short films
1910s American films